Tuo Erbatu (born 10 May 1993) is a Chinese Greco-Roman wrestler. He won one of the bronze medals in the 63kg event at the 2022 World Wrestling Championships held in Belgrade, Serbia. He won the gold medal the 63kg event at the 2019 Asian Wrestling Championships held in Xi'an, China.

Career 

He lost his bronze medal match at the 2017 Asian Indoor and Martial Arts Games held in Ashgabat, Turkmenistan. In 2018, he competed at the Asian Wrestling Championships held in Bishkek, Kyrgyzstan. He lost his bronze medal match in the 63kg event at the 2018 World Wrestling Championships held in Budapest, Hungary.

In 2019, he competed in the 63kg event at the World Wrestling Championships held in Nur-Sultan, Kazakhstan. He was eliminated in his first match by eventual bronze medalist Almat Kebispayev of Kazakhstan.

Achievements

References

External links 
 

Living people
1993 births
Place of birth missing (living people)
Chinese male sport wrestlers
World Wrestling Championships medalists
Asian Wrestling Championships medalists
21st-century Chinese people